GKR may refer to:
 GKR, an artist contracted with Mad Decent
 Project G.e.e.K.e.R., an animated television series
 Honor to serve Riga (Latvian: Gods kalpot Rīgai!), a municipal political party located in Riga, Latvia
 Ghakkhar Mandi railway station, the station code GKR